Capila phanaeus, commonly known as the fulvous dawnfly, is a species of hesperid butterfly found in India and Southeast Asia.

Range
The butterfly occurs in India in the northeast, namely, in Meghalaya (Khasi Hills), Manipur and Mizoram (Lushai Hills) onto Myanmar (Maymyo, Karen Hills and Tavoy). It is also found in Indo-China in the countries of Thailand, southern Vietnam and Laos, in the Malay Peninsula as well as in Sumatra and Borneo.

The type locality is Sarawak, Malaysia.

Status
This butterfly is considered rare.

See also
Pyrginae
Hesperiidae
List of butterflies of India (Pyrginae)
List of butterflies of India (Hesperiidae)

Cited references

References
Print

Watson, E. Y. (1891) Hesperiidae indicae: being a reprint of descriptions of the Hesperiidae of India, Burma, and Ceylon.. Vest and Co. Madras.
Online

Brower, Andrew V. Z. (2007). Capila Moore 1866. Version 4 March 2007 (under construction). http://tolweb.org/Capila/95329/2007.03.04 in The Tree of Life Web Project, http://tolweb.org/

Capila
Butterflies of Asia
Butterflies of Malaysia
Butterflies of Indonesia
Butterflies of Indochina